Red Buddha is a 1971 album composed and performed by Japanese percussionist Stomu Yamashta, recorded in 1970 and re-released on CD (Spalax) in 2006.

Track listing
All songs composed and arranged by Stomu Yamashta

"Red Buddha" - 15:19 
"As Expanding As" - 15:55

Personnel
Stomu Yamashta - metal strings, cymbal, musical saw, mandolin harp, steel drum, marimba, cow bell, wood block, and skin drum

References

1971 albums